Frank Matt Baumann (July 1, 1933 – December 13, 2020) was an American pitcher in Major League Baseball who played for the Boston Red Sox, Chicago White Sox and Chicago Cubs between  and .

Baumann signed with the Red Sox in 1952 out of high school in his native St. Louis, receiving a $90,000 bonus from owner Tom Yawkey, who nicknamed him "Beau".  He won 10 of 11 decisions for the Triple-A Louisville Colonels in 1953, his second season in professional baseball, before being drafted into United States Army service during the Korean War.

When he mustered out of the Army in mid-1955, he joined the MLB Red Sox in late July. In his debut, he earned a victory with 5 innings of scoreless relief, as Boston defeated the Detroit Tigers, 3–2. But an arm injury incurred during his military service hampered his Red Sox tenure. He needed return trips to the minor leagues from 1956 to 1958 before making the Red Sox roster for the full  campaign. Then, that November, he was traded to the White Sox for first baseman  Ron Jackson.

In , as a member of the defending American League champions, he had a 13–6 mark for the White Sox, and led AL pitchers with a 2.67 ERA. In 47 games pitched, including 20 starts, he compiled seven complete games and two shutouts. He added four saves as a relief pitcher. His ERA climbed to 6.19, and Baumann was traded to the cross-town Cubs during the off-season. He made four appearances out of the Cub bullpen in 1965, posted an ERA over 7.00, and was sent to Triple-A during the May roster cutdown from 28 to 25 men. His active career concluded after that season.

In his 11-season MLB career, Baumann posted a 45–38 record with a 4.11 ERA and 14 saves in 244 games pitched. Of his 78 starting assignments, 19 were complete gates and four were shutouts. In 797 innings pitched, he allowed 856 hits and 300 base on balls, with 384 strikeouts.

Baumann died on December 13, 2020, in St. Louis, Missouri.

References

External links

Frank Baumann MLB - Baseballbiography.com
Retrosheet

1933 births
2020 deaths
Albany Senators players
American League ERA champions
Baseball players from St. Louis
Boston Red Sox players
Chicago Cubs players
Chicago White Sox players
Louisville Colonels (minor league) players
Major League Baseball pitchers
Memphis Chickasaws players
Oklahoma City Indians players
Salt Lake City Bees players